is a Prefectural Natural Park in southeast Kagoshima Prefecture, Japan. Established in 1977, the park spans the municipalities of Kanoya and Tarumizu.

See also
 National Parks of Japan

References

Parks and gardens in Kagoshima Prefecture
Protected areas established in 1977
1977 establishments in Japan